Frederick John Kingsbury IV (May 20, 1927 – October 7, 2011) was an American rower who competed in the 1948 Summer Olympics.

He was born in Fredericksburg, Virginia and was the son of Frederick John Kingsbury Jr.

In 1948 he was a crew member of the American boat which won the bronze medal in the coxless fours event. He went on to a career in sonar technology in New London, Connecticut. He settled in Guilford.

External links
 
 Fred Kingsbury's obituary

1927 births
2011 deaths
Rowers at the 1948 Summer Olympics
Olympic bronze medalists for the United States in rowing
American male rowers
Medalists at the 1948 Summer Olympics
Phillips Exeter Academy alumni